Snapfinger Creek is a stream in DeKalb County, Georgia. Another DeKalb waterway, Barbashela Creek, flows into Snapfinger, which flows into the South River.

Some say Snapfinger Creek was so named because it is a tributary or "finger," while others believe an incident in which a surveyor broke or "snapped" his finger bone while crossing the creek caused this name to be selected.

References

Rivers of Georgia (U.S. state)
Rivers of DeKalb County, Georgia